The 2022–23 Slovenian Second League season is the 32nd edition of the Slovenian Second League. The season began on 29 July 2022 and will end on 20 May 2023.

Competition format
Each team will play a total of 30 matches (15 home and 15 away). Teams will play two matches against each other (1 home and 1 away).

Teams

League table

Standings

Results

See also
2022–23 Slovenian PrvaLiga

References

External links
Official website 

Slovenian Second League seasons
2
Slovenia
Current association football seasons